This is a list of sound archives.

A sound archive(s) is a specialized archive that is often maintained by a nation, state, university, non-profit organization, or corporation.  This article contains a list of sound archives.

A

 Acoustic Atlas
 American Philosophical Society Library
 American Radio Archive
 Archive of the Indigenous Languages of Latin America
 Archives of Traditional Music, Indiana University
 Australian Lesbian and Gay Archives
 Australian Screen Online
 Austrian State Archives

B

 BBC Sound Archive
 British Library Sound Archive

C

D

E

 EMI Archive Trust
 Endangered Languages Archive (ELAR)

F

 The Full English (folk music archive)

G

 German Broadcasting Archive
 The Great 78 Project

H

I

 Institut national de l'audiovisuel
 International Association of Sound and Audiovisual Archives
 International Dialects of English Archive
 Internet Archive

J

K

 Kaipuleohone

L

 Live Music Archive

M

  Marr Sound Archives

N

 National Audiovisual Institute (Finland)
 National Film and Sound Archive
 National Library of Australia
 National Recording Preservation Board
 New York Public Library for the Performing Arts
 North West Sound Archive

O

 Österreichische Mediathek

P

 Pacifica Radio Archives
 Pangloss Collection
 Paradisec
 Poetry Archive
 Provincial Archives of Alberta

Q

R

 Ralph Rinzler Folklife Archives and Collections
 Rigler-Deutsch Index

S

 Sample library
 Scotsoun
 Sounddogs
 SoundStorm (company)

T

U

 Uysal–Walker Archive of Turkish Oral Narrative

V

W

X

Y

Z

See also 

 Sound archive
 List of music archivists
 List of film archives
 List of archives

 
Broadcasting lists